HMS Fencer (D64/R308) was an American-built  that served with the Royal Navy during the Second World War.

She spent most of her career escorting convoys in the North Atlantic and Arctic Ocean, she transferred to the British East Indies Fleet in October 1944.

Construction
Fencer was laid down 5 September 1941, as a C3-S-A1 freighter, under Maritime Commission contract, MC hull #197, by Western Pipe and Steel Company, in San Francisco, California. While under construction she was transferred to the Admiralty under the Lend-Lease agreement, with a Royal Navy commissioning crew arriving in May 1942, under the command of Commander C.N. Lentaigne, RN. She was launched on 4 April 1942, sponsored by Mrs. Powers Symington. She was redesignated as ACV-14, on 20 Aug 1942. She was commissioned into the US Navy on 20 February 1943, as Croatan, and decommissioned and transferred to the RN, on 27 February 1943. She was commissioned into the RN, on 1 March 1943, as HMS Fencer (D64), with Captain E.W. Anstice, RN in command.

Design and description
Fencer was the fourth ship in what became the Royal Navy's  of 11 ships; one of 38 escort carriers built in the United States for the Royal Navy during the Second World War. The Western Pipe & Steel shipyards built three other ships in the class. Once completed she was supplied under the terms of Lend-Lease agreement to the Royal Navy. There was a ships complement of 646 men, who lived in crew accommodation that was significantly different from the arrangements that were normal for the Royal Navy at the time. The separate messes no longer had to prepare their own food, as everything was cooked in the galley and served cafeteria style in a central dining area. They were also equipped with a modern laundry and a barber shop. The traditional hammocks were replaced by three-tier bunk-beds, 18 to a cabin, which were hinged and could be tied up to provide extra space when not in use.

She displaced  at full load.

She had the capacity for up to 24 aircraft which could be a mixture of anti-submarine and fighter aircraft; the British Hawker Sea Hurricane and Supermarine Seafire naval fighters, Fairey Swordfish torpedo bomber or the American-supplied Grumman Martlet and Vought F4U Corsair fighters or Grumman Avenger torpedo bomber could be carried. The exact composition of the embarked squadrons depended upon the mission. Some squadrons were composite squadrons for convoy defence and would be equipped with both anti-submarine and fighter aircraft, while other squadrons working in a strike carrier role would only be equipped with fighter aircraft. Aircraft facilities were a small combined bridge–flight control on the starboard side and above the  flight deck, two aircraft lifts , and nine arrestor wires. Aircraft could be housed in the   hangar below the flight deck.

The ships armament concentrated on anti-aircraft (AA) defence and comprised two QF  MK V dual purpose guns in single mounts, eight  Bofors guns in twin mounts and ten  Oerlikon cannons in single and eight in twin mounts.

Fencer was designed to accompany other ships forming the escort for convoys. The anti-submarine aircraft employed were initially the Fairey Swordfish and later the Grumman Avenger, which could be armed with torpedoes, depth charges,  bombs or RP-3 rocket projectiles. As well as carrying out their own attacks on U-Boats, these aircraft identified their locations for the convoy's escorts to mount an attack. Typically anti-submarine patrols would be flown between dawn and dusk. One aircraft would fly about  ahead of the convoy, while another patrolled astern. Patrols would last between two and three hours, using both radar and visual observation in their search for U-Boats.
Fencer also had a secondary role, providing oil and provisions for her accompanying destroyers. This could be a lengthy process and was done on the move. It took 40 minutes from firing a line across to the destroyer to start pumping oil, while it took another two hours to pump 98 tons of oil and a further 35 minutes to disconnect the hose pipe and secure the equipment.

Service history
As an anti-submarine warfare (ASW) carrier, Fencer escorted convoys in the North Atlantic and to 
Russia.

On 10 February 1944, while escorting Convoy ON-223 in the North Atlantic west of Ireland, one of her Fairey Swordfish from 842 squadron, sank , with depth charges, 51 dead (all hands lost).

When Operation Tungsten completed Fencer set sail for the Kola Inlet. On 28 April 1944, Fencer left Kola Inlet, as an escort for the 45 ship convoy RA 59, for Loch Ewe, in Scotland. For the next three days, Swordfish from 842 squadron, flying from Fencer, would sink one U-boat a day. The convoy arrived at Loch Ewe, on 6 May.

Fencer was assigned to the East Indies Fleet in late October 1944. She departed Greenock, with her sister ship , for Ceylon, present day Sri Lanka, with the DeHavilland Mosquito fighter bombers of 618 squadron on their decks. After stops at Gibraltar, Port Said, and transit through the Suez Canal, she arrived at Trincomalee Harbour. On 23 December 1944, the escort carriers arrived in Melbourne.

She was converted to trooping duties at the Selborne dry dock at Simon's Town, South Africa, from 9–11 July 1944. Fencer was then tasked with ferrying civilian and military personnel to Mombassa, then Ceylon, and then the UK.

Decommissioning
Following World War II, she returned to the USN, 11 December 1946, stricken for disposal on 28 January 1947, and sold into merchant service 30 December 1947.

Civilian service
Fencer, along with the Ruler-class , were sold to the Italian businessman Achille Lauro, for conversion to passenger ships for the Italy-Australia service. Fencer was moved to Jacksonville, Florida, for stripping before being sent to SA Navalmeccanica Cantieri, where she was converted and renamed Sidney.

During the winter of 1958–1959, Sidney was modernized at Genoa, which increased her first class capacity to 119 and her tourist class capacity to 994. She was renamed Roma in 1968, after Roma, ex-Atheling, was scrapped. She was laid up in La Spezia, in October 1970, and sold in December 1970, to joint owners Cosmos Tours and Sovereign Cruises, Cyprus, and renamed Galaxy Queen. Her registry was moved to Greece, in 1973, and renamed Lady Tina, before being sold and renamed Caribia 2. In September 1974, Caribia 2 arrived at La Spezia, to await scrapping. She was sold in September 1975, for breaking.

FAA squadrons

References

Bibliography

External links

 

Type C3-S-A2 ships of the Royal Navy
Attacker-class escort carriers
Ships built in San Francisco
1942 ships
World War II aircraft carriers of the United Kingdom